Tom Richards may refer to:
 Tom Richards (actor) (born 1948), Australian television actor
 Tom Richards (athlete) (1910–1985), British marathon runner
 Tom Richards (rugby union) (1882–1935), Australian rugby union footballer
 Tom Richards (squash player) (born 1986), English squash player
 Tom Richards (footballer) (born 1994), English football player

See also
 Thomas Richards (disambiguation)